Club Esportiu Escola Pia Sabadell, also known as Basquet Pia, is an amateur basketball team based in Sabadell, Catalonia, Spain. The team was founded in 1982, inside the Escola Pia Sabadell, a school of Sabadell. They play in Copa Catalunya.

Best organization of Sabadell from the years 1985 and 1986 to the Dedication to School Sport

Season by season

References and notes

External links
Official website
Profile at FCBQ

Sabadell
Catalan basketball teams
Basketball teams established in 1982